Odon of Poznań, also known as Odon of Greater Poland and Mieszkowic, (1149 – 20 April 1194) was Duke of Greater Poland in 1179–1181, and Duke of Kalisz from 1193 to 1194.

He was the oldest son of Mieszko III the Old, Duke of Greater Poland (and since 1173, High Duke of Poland) by his first wife, Elisabeth, who was the daughter of King Béla II of Hungary.

Life
Odon's name appeared for the first time as a signatory in a document issued on 21 May 1161 at Łęczyca, the location of the first Polish Sejm.

In 1177, Odon joined the revolt of the Lesser Polish nobility against his own father, Mieszko III the Old, because of the favoritism Mieszko III had shown to the offspring of his second marriage. Additionally, the High Duke had attempted to force Odon to become a priest in order to eliminate him from the succession. As well, Odon wanted to have some land and found an opportunity to conquer the Duchy of Greater Poland. His uncle Casimir II the Just also supported him. The war lasted for 2 years until Mieszko III was deposed and exiled to Bohemia in 1179.

By 1181, Mieszko III had returned to Poland. Enlisting the aid of the Pomeranians, he not only recovered Greater Poland but also expanded it to include Gniezno and Kalisz. In 1191, Mieszko III divided his duchy: Odon received Poznan, his younger half-brother Mieszko IV the Younger received Kalisz and Mieszko III kept Gniezno. Some historians once believed that he remained in the Greater Poland capital until his death.

When Odon’s younger half-brother Mieszko IV died on 2 August 1193, Odon obtained the Duchy of Kalisz with his father's blessing.

Little is known about Odon's reign over Kalisz beyond the fact that he founded a mint, where coins have been recovered bearing the inscription "Odon Dux" ("Duke Odon")—suggesting a high degree of autonomy.

Odon died on 20 April 1194. He was buried in the Cathedral of Poznań.

Marriage and issue
In about 1184, Odon married Viacheslava (d. aft. 1200), daughter of Yaroslav Vladimirovich "Osmomysl", Prince of Halych. They had 3 children:
 Władysław Odonic (c. 1190 – 5 June 1239)
 Ryksa (c. 1191 – 18 November aft. 1238)
 Euphrosyne (c. 1192/94 – 23 August 1235); married c. 1225 to Swantopolk II, Duke of Pomerania.

Since Odon's son Władysław was too young to reign, Odon bestowed the regency of his duchy in the south of Greater Poland upon his half-brother, Władysław III Spindleshanks, while Mieszko III reclaimed the Duchy of Kalisz.

References

See also
Dukes of Greater Poland

Dukes of Greater Poland
1140s births
1194 deaths
Burials at Poznań Cathedral
Year of birth uncertain